M. Dind (1879 – 30 January 1946) was a New Zealand cricketer. He played in eleven first-class matches for Wellington from 1917 to 1920.

Newspapers of the day have numerous references to an M. J. Dind, left-handed batsman playing for Wellington from December 1918, when he and  Arthur Fenton replaced Ernest Beechey and Bertie Tuckwell for a match against Canterbury, to January 1920 when Wellington played Auckland. He was subsequently player and vice-president of the Midland Cricket Club.

See also
 List of Wellington representative cricketers

References

External links
 

1879 births
1946 deaths
New Zealand cricketers
Wellington cricketers
Cricketers from Queensland